Nimesh Patel (born 1986) is an American comedian and television writer. In 2017, he became the first Indian American writer on Saturday Night Live.

Early and personal life
Nimesh Patel was born in Parsippany-Troy Hills Township in the Morris County of New Jersey in 1986 into an immigrant Indian Gujarati Hindu family. His parents immigrated to the United States from India in the 1970s, his father first came to Newark, New Jersey as a 17 year old, worked as a cashier at a Macy's, then eventually opened a liquor store in a troubled neighborhood with heavy African-American organized crime and gang culture in Irvington, Essex County, often being robbed and also shot at.

Patel moved to New York City, for attending New York University where he started out as a pre-med student and has lived in the city ever since. He graduated from the New York University's Stern School of Business with a degree in Finance in 2008.

Patel is a Hindu and still identifies as one, although he isn't practicing.

Patel criticized the Partition of India on one of his shows, part of his "Come see me on tour!" and dunked on a British Indian woman in the audience defending British Colonialism and tyranny in India, eventually calling out the stolen Indian Kohinoor diamond by the British Royalty and calling the woman a self-loather.

He used to live in Hell's Kitchen, Midtown Manhattan, but now resides in Brooklyn. He's a regular comic at the Comedy Cellar, a comedy club in Greenwich Village, Lower Manhattan.

Career
After graduating, Patel began working during the day and performing standup at The Stress Factory by night. In 2016, he was a finalist in Kevin Hart's Laugh Out Loud Network Pitch Panel at Just for Laughs ComedyPRO.

In 2015, he was doing standup in Greenpoint, Brooklyn when he was discovered by Chris Rock. Patel then joined Rock's writing team for the 88th Academy Awards ceremony. He also wrote material for Hasan Minhaj's 2017 White House Correspondents' Association Dinner appearance. In 2017, Patel began working as a full-time writer for Saturday Night Live, mainly writing jokes for Weekend Update. In 2018, Patel was nominated for an Emmy Award for Outstanding Writing for his work on SNL.

Patel has appeared on @midnight, Comedy Knockout and Late Night with Seth Meyers. He has also featured as a comedy and politics panelist at the Foreign Affairs Symposium at Johns Hopkins University.

On November 30, 2018, roughly twenty-four minutes into a comedy set, Patel was interrupted and asked to leave by the organizers of cultureSHOCK: Reclaim, an event for Asian representation hosted by Columbia University's Asian American Alliance. On October 7, 2020, Patel posted a video of his full Columbia set in response to an article he believed to be untruthful.

Influences
Patel's main comedic influences are Chris Rock, Larry David and Patrice O’Neal.

Awards and honors
 2017 - Nominated for Writers Guild of America Award for Comedy/Variety (Music, Awards, Tributes) – Specials for the 88th Academy Awards
 2018 - Nominated for Primetime Emmy Award for Outstanding Writing for a Variety Series for Saturday Night Live

References

External links
 Nimesh Patel on the IMDb

1986 births
Living people
American people of Indian descent
American people of Gujarati descent
American Hindus
People from Parsippany-Troy Hills, New Jersey
American television writers
American male comedians
American comedians of Indian descent
New York University alumni
Screenwriters from New Jersey
21st-century American comedians
American male television writers
21st-century American screenwriters
21st-century American male writers